Zouan-Hounien Department is a department of Tonkpi Region in Montagnes District, Ivory Coast. In 2021, its population was 250,938 and its seat is the settlement of Zouan-Hounien. The sub-prefectures of the department are Banneu, Bin-Houyé, Goulaleu, Téapleu, Yelleu, and Zouan-Hounien.

History
Zouan-Hounien Department was created in 2005 as a second-level subdivision via a split-off from Danané Department. At its creation, it was part of Dix-Huit Montagnes Region.

In 2011, districts were introduced as new first-level subdivisions of Ivory Coast. At the same time, regions were reorganised and became second-level subdivisions and all departments were converted into third-level subdivisions. At this time, Zouan-Hounien Department became part of Tonkpi Region in Montagnes District.

Notes

Departments of Tonkpi
2005 establishments in Ivory Coast
States and territories established in 2005